The 1974 Washington State Cougars football team was an American football team that represented Washington State University in the Pacific-8 Conference (Pac-8) during the 1974 NCAA Division I football season. In their seventh season under head coach Jim Sweeney, the Cougars compiled a 2–9 record (1–6 in Pac-8, seventh), and were outscored 272 to 162.

The team's statistical leaders included John Hopkins with 522 passing yards, Ron Cheatham with 616 rushing yards, and Carl Barschig with 423 receiving yards.

In Eugene, the Cougars defeated Oregon for the fourth straight year; it was WSU's only conference victory, and the Ducks went winless in the Pac-8. The Cougars had an opportunity for an unprecedented third consecutive victory over rival Washington, but lost by seven points in Spokane.

This was the first season for the concrete north grandstand at Martin Stadium, the student section was formerly a wooden grandstand constructed in the 1930s as part of Rogers Field.

Schedule

Roster

All-conference

Three Washington State seniors were named to the All-Pac-8 team; guard Steve Ostermann, center Geoff Reece, and linebacker Gary Larsen. Ostermann was named to the first team for a third consecutive year and Reece was a repeat selection.

NFL Draft
Three Cougars were selected in the 1975 NFL Draft.

References

External links
 Game program: Ohio State vs. WSU at Seattle – October 5, 1974
 Game program: USC vs. WSU at Spokane – October 12, 1974
 Game program: Stanford at WSU – October 26, 1974
 Game program: Oregon State at WSU – November 9, 1974

Washington State
Washington State Cougars football seasons
Washington State Cougars football